Little Stranger is a 1934 British drama film directed by George King and starring Nigel Playfair, Eva Moore and Norah Baring. It was made as a quota quickie.

Cast
 Nigel Playfair as Sam Collins  
 Eva Moore as Jessie Collins  
 Norah Baring as Millie Dent 
 Hamilton Keene as Tom Hale
 Charles Hawtrey

References

Bibliography
 Chibnall, Steve. Quota Quickies: The Birth of the British 'B' Film. British Film Institute, 2007.
 Low, Rachael. Filmmaking in 1930s Britain. George Allen & Unwin, 1985.
 Wood, Linda. British Films, 1927-1939. British Film Institute, 1986.

External links

1934 films
British drama films
1934 drama films
Films directed by George King
Quota quickies
Films set in England
British black-and-white films
1930s English-language films
1930s British films